2022 United Kingdom government crisis or crises may refer to:
 July 2022 United Kingdom government crisis, events culminating in the resignation of Boris Johnson as prime minister
 September 2022 United Kingdom mini-budget, events under the Truss ministry preceding the October 2022 UK government crisis
 October 2022 United Kingdom government crisis, events in the aftermath of the September mini-budget, culminating in the resignation of Liz Truss as prime minister